
Dzierżoniów County is a unit of territorial administration and local government (powiat) in Lower Silesian Voivodeship, south-western Poland. It came into being on January 1, 1999, as a result of the Polish local government reforms passed in 1998. Its administrative seat is the town of Dzierżoniów, and it also contains four other towns: Bielawa, Niemcza, Pieszyce and Piława Górna.

As at 2019 the total population of the county is 101,118. This figure breaks down as follows: Dzierżoniów 33,239, Bielawa 29,971, Pieszyce 7,123, Piława Górna 6,412, Niemcza 2,965, rural areas 21,408.

Neighbouring counties
Dzierżoniów County is bordered by Świdnica County to the north, Wrocław County to the north-east, Strzelin County to the east, Ząbkowice Śląskie County to the south-east, Kłodzko County to the south and Wałbrzych County to the west.

Administrative division
The county is subdivided into seven gminas (three urban, two urban-rural and two rural). These are listed in the following table, in descending order of population.

The highest peaks

Wielka Sowa – 1015 m
Kalenica – 964 m
Wilczyna – 665 m
Kuczaba – 654 m
Radunia (Ślęża Masiff) – 578 m

References

 
Land counties of Lower Silesian Voivodeship